The Francis H. Holmes House is a historic house at 349 Rocky Hill Ave. in New Britain, Connecticut.  Built in 1906–08, it is an architecturally eclectic brick building, designed by a prominent local architect for the owner of a local brickmaking business, as a showcase for the latter's wares.  The house was listed on the National Register of Historic Places in 1984.

Description and history
The Francis H. Holmes House is located in southeastern New Britain, at the northwest corner of Rocky Hill Avenue and South Street.  It is a two-story brick structure, with a flared hip roof and brownstone trim.  It exhibits an architecturally eclectic mix of styles, with the Jacobethan use of triple windows and gables predominating.  Also present are elements of Shingle style and Craftsman woodwork.  The roof is pierced by large gabled dormers with brownstone parapets.  An enclosed porch wraps from the east-facing facade to the south, and a similarly styled former porte-cochere, now also enclosed, is on the north side.

The house was designed by Walter P. Crabtree and built in 1906-08 for Francis Holmes, who owned a local brickyard.  Crabtree was a prominent local architect whose credits include the local Masonic lodge, the Elks building, and numerous commercial and residential buildings in New Britain and Hartford.  Holmes owned a brickyard just to the south in Berlin, and was instrumental in founding the Central Connecticut Brick Company, a consolidation of several regional brickyards.

See also
National Register of Historic Places listings in Hartford County, Connecticut

References

Houses on the National Register of Historic Places in Connecticut
Shingle Style architecture in Connecticut
Tudor Revival architecture in Connecticut
Houses completed in 1906
Houses in Hartford County, Connecticut
Buildings and structures in New Britain, Connecticut
National Register of Historic Places in Hartford County, Connecticut
1906 establishments in Connecticut